Zemo Okrokana (literally — "Upper Golden Field") is a village in the historical region of Khevi, north-eastern Georgia. It is located on the right bank of the Tergi tributary river – Mnaisi. Administratively, it is part of the Kazbegi Municipality in Mtskheta-Mtianeti. Distance to the municipality center Stepantsminda is 24 km.

Sources 
 Georgian Soviet Encyclopedia, V. 4, p. 510, Tbilisi, 1979 year.

References

Kobi Community villages